Acronictinae is a large subfamily of moths in the family Noctuidae.

References